Luiz Arthuro Cané Jr. (born 2 April 1981) is a Brazilian mixed martial artist currently competing in the Light Heavyweight division. A professional competitor since 2005, Cané has formerly competed for the UFC.

Background
Born and raised in the Jardim Bonfiglioli neighborhood, located in the district of Butantan, west side of the city of São Paulo, Luiz Cané alternated working hours in a restaurant with his parents, with hours of training in Jiu-Jitsu Academy Gracie Butantã with Ryan Gracie, and Muay Thai with the team Gibi Thai / Pamplona, of the fighters Mosés Gibi and Eduardo Pamplona.

Mixed martial arts career

Ultimate Fighting Championship
Cané lost in his UFC debut at UFC 79 via disqualification when he threw an illegal knee to a downed James Irvin.

Cané later defeated Jason Lambert via first round TKO at UFC 85 in England.

Cané won his second straight fight over Rameau Thierry Sokoudjou on 18 October 2008, at UFC 89 via TKO in the second round. He earned Knockout of the Night honors with his performance.

At UFC 97 on 18 April 2009 he defeated Steve Cantwell via unanimous decision where he displayed a good chin and disciplined striking ability.

Cané was TKO'ed by Antônio Rogério Nogueira in the first round of their fight on 21 November 2009, at UFC 106. A left hook to the jaw sent Cané to the floor as Nogueira finished with a series of punches on the ground.

Cané fought UFC newcomer Cyrille Diabate on 29 May 2010, at UFC 114 and lost via first round TKO after rocking Diabate early in the fight.

Cané was expected to face Karlos Vemola on 19 March 2011 at UFC 128.  However, Vemola was forced from the bout with an injury and replaced by Eliot Marshall. He won the fight via TKO in the first round.

Cané next faced promotional newcomer Stanislav Nedkov on 27 August 2011 at UFC 134. After out-striking and bloodying Nedkov early on, Cané lost via TKO near the end of the first round.

Cané was expected to make his Middleweight debut against Yushin Okami on 11 August 2012 at UFC 150. However, Cané was forced out of the bout with an injury and replaced by Rousimar Palhares. Rousimar Palhares was forced out of the bout because of injury and was later replaced by Buddy Roberts.

Cané fought Chris Camozzi on 13 October 2012 at UFC 153 in his Middleweight debut. Despite a strong first round, he ultimately lost the fight via unanimous decision. Following the loss he was released from the UFC.

Post-UFC
After a long layoff from the sport, Cané returned as a Light Heavyweight and faced Rodney Wallace at SFT 1 on 20 September 2013. Cané won via KO in the first round.

Cané followed up by defeating Fábio Silva via unanimous decision at SFT 2 on 29 November 2013.

Cané faced Alexandre Zaneti on 4 October 2014 at Brazilian Fighting Championship 4. He lost the fight via TKO in the second round.

Cané faced Wesley Martins Garcia de Almeida at Thunder Fight 2: MMA Championship on 19 December 2014. He won the fight via KO due to a punch in the first round.

Cané faced fellow UFC veteran Matt Hamill at Fight 2 Night 2 on 28 April 2017 in Brazil. He lost the fight via knockout in the first round.

Personal life
Cané trains with UFC fighter Demian Maia in São Paulo.

Championships and Accomplishments
 Ultimate Fighting Championship
 Knockout of the Night (One time) vs. Rameau Sokoudjou

Mixed martial arts record

|-
| Loss
| align=center| 17–7 (1)
| Matt Hamill
| KO (punches)
| F2N: Fight2Night2
| 
| align=center|1
| align=center| 0:38
| Foz do Iguaçu, Brazil
|
|-
| Win
|align=center| 17–6 (1)
| Mateus Messaros Inacio
| TKO (punches)
| Predador FC 35
|
|align=center|1
|align=center|2:00
|São Paulo, Brazil
|
|-
| Win
|align=center| 16–6 (1)
| Felipe Silva
| TKO (punches)
| Shooto Brazil 54
|
|align=center|1
|align=center|0:49
|Rio de Janeiro, Brazil
|
|-
| Win
|align=center| 15–6 (1)
| Wesley Martins Garcia de Almeida
| KO (punch)
| Thunder Fight 2: MMA Championship
|
|align=center|1
|align=center|1:04
|São Paulo, Brazil
|
|-
| Loss
|align=center| 14–6 (1)
| Alexandre Zaneti
| TKO (punches)
| Brazilian Fighting Championship 4
|
|align=center|2
|align=center|3:20
|São Paulo, Brazil
|
|-
| Win
|align=center| 14–5 (1)
| Fábio Silva
| Decision (unanimous)
| SFT 2
| 
|align=center| 3
|align=center| 5:00
|São Paulo, Brazil
|
|-
| Win
|align=center| 13–5 (1)
| Rodney Wallace
| KO (flying knee and punches)
| SFT 1
| 
|align=center| 1
|align=center| 3:56
|São Paulo, Brazil
|Return to Light Heavyweight.
|-
| Loss
|align=center| 12–5 (1)
| Chris Camozzi
| Decision (unanimous)
| UFC 153
| 
|align=center| 3
|align=center| 5:00
|Rio de Janeiro, Brazil
| 
|-
| Loss
|align=center| 12–4 (1)
| Stanislav Nedkov
| TKO (punches)
| UFC 134
| 
|align=center| 1
|align=center| 4:13
|Rio de Janeiro, Brazil
|
|-
| Win
|align=center| 12–3 (1)
| Eliot Marshall
| TKO (punches)
| UFC 128
| 
|align=center| 1
|align=center| 2:15
|Newark, New Jersey, United States
| 
|-
| Loss
|align=center| 11–3 (1)
| Cyrille Diabate
| TKO (punches)
| UFC 114
| 
|align=center| 1
|align=center| 2:13
|Las Vegas, Nevada, United States
| 
|-
| Loss
|align=center| 11–2 (1)
| Antônio Rogério Nogueira
| TKO (punches)
| UFC 106
| 
|align=center| 1
|align=center| 1:56
|Las Vegas, Nevada, United States
| 
|-
| Win
|align=center| 11–1 (1)
| Steve Cantwell
| Decision (unanimous)
| UFC 97
| 
|align=center| 3
|align=center| 5:00
|Montreal, Quebec, Canada
| 
|-
| Win
|align=center| 10–1 (1)
| Rameau Sokoudjou
| TKO (punches)
| UFC 89
| 
|align=center| 2
|align=center| 4:15
|Birmingham, England
| 
|-
| Win 
|align=center| 9–1 (1)
| Jason Lambert
| TKO (punches)
| UFC 85
| 
|align=center| 1
|align=center| 2:07
|London, England
| 
|-
| Loss
|align=center| 8–1 (1)
| James Irvin
| DQ (illegal knee)
| UFC 79
| 
|align=center| 1
|align=center| 1:51
|Las Vegas, Nevada, United States
| 
|-
| Win
|align=center| 8–0 (1)
| James Damien Stelly
| KO (knee)
| Art of War 3
| 
|align=center| 1
|align=center| 2:45
|Dallas, Texas, United States
| 
|-
| Win
|align=center| 7–0 (1)
| Wagner Ribeiro
| Submission (soccer kicks)
| Minotauro Fights 5
| 
|align=center| 1
|align=center| 2:53
|Sao Paulo, Brazil
| 
|-
| Win
|align=center| 6–0 (1)
| Joao Assis
| TKO (punches)
| Fury FC 2: Final Combat
| 
|align=center| 1
|align=center| 3:41
|Sao Paulo, Brazil
| 
|-
| Win
|align=center| 5–0 (1)
| Thiago Cardoso Capataz
| TKO
| Mega Fight 3
| 
|align=center| N/A
|align=center| N/A
|Sao Paulo, Brazil
| 
|-
| Win
|align=center| 4–0 (1)
| Mauricio Menegueti
| TKO (punches)
| CF: Coliseum Fight
| 
|align=center|1
|align=center|2:20
|Sao Paulo, Brazil
|
|-
| Win
|align=center| 3–0 (1)
| Gilson Ricardo
| TKO (punches)
| Predador FC 2
| 
|align=center| 1
|align=center| 2:25
|Sao Paulo, Brazil
| 
|-
| Win
|align=center| 2–0 (1)
| Maurice Igor
| TKO
| Coliseu Fight
| 
|align=center| N/A
|align=center| N/A
|Sao Paulo, Brazil
| 
|-
| Win
|align=center| 1–0 (1)
| Andre Gustavo
| TKO (corner stoppage)
| Estancia Fight 2
| 
|align=center| 1
|align=center| N/A
|Sao Paulo, Brazil
| 
|-
| NC
|align=center| 0–0 (1)
| Marcelo Alfaya
| No Contest
| Campeonato Brasileiro de Vale-Tudo
| 
|align=center| 1
|align=center| 3:01
|Sao Paulo, Brazil
|Alfaya could not continue after an inadvertent groin kick.
|}

References

External links
 
 

1981 births
Living people
Brazilian practitioners of Brazilian jiu-jitsu
People awarded a black belt in Brazilian jiu-jitsu
Brazilian Muay Thai practitioners
Brazilian male mixed martial artists
Brazilian people of English descent
Light heavyweight mixed martial artists
Middleweight mixed martial artists
Mixed martial artists utilizing Muay Thai
Mixed martial artists utilizing Brazilian jiu-jitsu
Sportspeople from São Paulo
Ultimate Fighting Championship male fighters